Mother City F.C. were a South African association football club founded in 1999 after Seven Stars and Cape Town Spurs merged to form Ajax Cape Town, and Mother City purchased the Cape Town Spurs licence. The club was based in Cape Town.

History
The club set a number of unwanted records in their only season in the top flight. These included most losses in a season (28), fewest goals scored (22), most goals conceded (85), worst goal difference (-63), fewest points scored (10) and fewest away points scored (0).

The club suffered two relegations in three years.

Former managers
 Bernard Hartze (1999–2000)

League history

References

Association football clubs established in 1999
Premier Soccer League clubs
Soccer clubs in Cape Town
Defunct soccer clubs in South Africa
1999 establishments in South Africa